Ignorance Is Bliss is the ninth episode of the sixth season of the Fox television show House. It aired on November 23, 2009.

Plot 
On the eve of Thanksgiving, House and the team take on the case of James Sidas (Esteban Powell), an exceptionally brilliant physicist (IQ 178), in fact the youngest person to ever graduate MIT, who traded his successful career for a job as a courier to be with his intellectually inferior wife (IQ 87). For the ailing patient, intelligence is a miserable burden that alienates him from others. The team eventually suspects he suffers from TTP, but the splenectomy they perform does not improve his situation, ruling that condition out. However, it is later revealed that a depression as a teenager due to his loneliness as a child prodigy led him to attempt suicide, and House realizes that the ribs he broke back then made his spleen split into several parts, which is why the procedure had no effect – it was TTP all along. The remaining symptoms are explained after the discovery of his use of DXM (mixed with alcohol to prevent brain damage), which he used to reduce his intellect. As Sidas regains his status of intellectual genius by not abusing the addictive medicine, he begins work in applied physics, drawing a schematic for a toroidal helicon plasma device, and is reassured that he cannot relate to his wife with his original intellect. House, relating to his situation, essentially helps "lobotomize Einstein" by giving him back his meds, as the patient wishes to be dumb and happy rather than smart and miserable.

House tries to break up Lucas and Cuddy at Thanksgiving dinner. However, Cuddy gives him the wrong address on purpose to stop him from messing up the evening. Afterwards, House breaks into Lucas' home, faking a drunken stupor, tells Lucas about how much he wants to be with Cuddy. Cuddy arrives the next morning at House's apartment, lying about how she and Lucas had split up. Later in the episode, House finds out she lied after she did not accept free tickets he offered her.

Meanwhile, Chase wants to be left alone to deal with the fact that Cameron left, but everybody keeps on wanting to comfort him. As a result, Chase ends up punching House in the face. He later apologizes and tells House it was his means of keeping the others away.

Taub has problems with his wife, because she thinks that, at the age of 40, he's still doing an intern's job instead of having his own private practice. Taub convinces her that he confronted House for keeping him from Thanksgiving dinner by showing her a picture of House's beaten-up face (by Chase), claiming he was responsible, which soothes her.

Reception
Zack Handlen of The A.V. Club graded the episode a B.

References

External links 
 

House (season 6) episodes
2009 American television episodes

fr:Heureux les ignorants
it:Episodi di Dr. House - Medical Division (sesta stagione)#Beata ignoranza